James Dodds McClelland (August 7, 1848 in New York City – January 13, 1919 in Mount Vernon, Westchester County, New York) was an American lawyer and politician from New York.

Life
He was the son of John McClelland and Margaret McClelland. He attended private schools, and graduated from Mt. Washington Collegiate Institute in 1863. He graduated from New York University School of Law in 1867, was admitted to the bar, and practiced in New York City. In 1869, he married Annie Melso.

McClelland was a member of the New York State Assembly (New York Co., 9th D.) in 1882.

He was an Assistant D.A. of New York County from 1898 to 1901 (under Asa Bird Gardiner and Eugene A. Philbin).

He was a member of the New York State Senate (13th D.) from 1911 to 1914, sitting in the 134th, 135th, 136th and 137th New York State Legislatures.

In 1916, he was again appointed as an Assistant D.A. (under Edward Swann), prosecuting criminal cases.

McClelland died on January 13, 1919, at his home at 402 South Sixth Avenue in Mount Vernon, New York, of heart disease.

Sources
 Official New York from Cleveland to Hughes by Charles Elliott Fitch (Hurd Publishing Co., New York and Buffalo, 1911, Vol. IV; pg. 367)
 The New York Red Book (1913; pg. 97)
 Who's Who in New York by Geddings Harry Crawford (1916)
 Ex-Senator James D. McClelland in NYT on January 14, 1919

1848 births
1919 deaths
Democratic Party New York (state) state senators
People from Manhattan
Democratic Party members of the New York State Assembly
New York University School of Law alumni
19th-century American politicians